Benzanilide is the organic compound with the formula C6H5C(O)NHC6H5. It is a white solid.  Commercially available, it may be prepared by treating benzoic acid with aniline.

References